Douglass Weldon Smith (May 25, 1892 – September 18, 1973) was a relief pitcher in Major League Baseball who played briefly for the Boston Red Sox during the  season. He was born in Millers Falls, Massachusetts.
 
In a one game career, Smith posted a 3.00 ERA in 3.0 innings of work, including one strikeout and four hits allowed without a decision, walks or saves.

Smith died at the age of 81 in Millers Falls, Massachusetts.

Fact
Was a member of the 1912 American League champions Red Sox, although he did not play in the World Series.

See also
1912 Boston Red Sox season

External links
Baseball Reference
Retrosheet

Boston Red Sox players
Major League Baseball pitchers
Baseball players from Massachusetts
1892 births
1973 deaths
People from Montague, Massachusetts
Meriden Hopes players